"The Knoc" is a song by American rapper, Knoc-Turn'al. The song features guest vocals by hip-hop musicians Dr. Dre and Missy Elliott. It was originally released as the lead single for Knoc's unreleased album, Knoc's Landin (2002). In spite of the album's shelving, "The Knoc" initially saw a release on the summer EP, L.A. Confidential presents: Knoc-turn'al due to the single's Grammy nomination and charting on the Billboard Hot 100.

Music video
A music video for the single was directed by Jeff Richter and premiered on MuchMusic in early February 2002. It begins with Knoc and Dre sitting at a restaurant, waiting for their order as the camera moves around in a continuous shot until the end of the video. Knoc is seen in multiple roles (such as a waiter, a crackhead, a pimp and a chef). When Knoc (as a waiter) drops dishes on the ground, Missy Elliott enters the restaurant singing her verses and meets up with her boyfriend (Knoc) at a table.

Track listings and formats
12"/CD single
 "Knoc" (Amended Version)       
 "Knoc" (Original Version)        
 "Knoc" (Instrumental)        
 "Knoc" (Acapella)        
 "Knoc" (TV Track)

Chart performance
The song peaked at numbers 98 and 67 on the Hot 100 and the Billboard Hot R&B/Hip-Hop Songs respectively. Despite its underperformance on the charts, the song still garnered a Grammy nomination for "Best Short Form Music Video."

Release history

References

2002 singles
2002 songs
Knoc-turn'al songs
Dr. Dre songs
Missy Elliott songs
Music videos directed by Jeff Richter
Song recordings produced by Dr. Dre
Songs written by Missy Elliott
Songs written by Dr. Dre